Melanie Stimmell Van Latum, born 1975 in Los Angeles, is an international 3D street painter and fine artist specializing in large scale chalk art and Renaissance-style inspired imagery.

A Signature member of the Pastel Society of America, she began
street painting in 1998 and has painted at festivals throughout the United States and internationally. Melanie Stimmell works with clients in Turkey, the Netherlands, Canada, France, Thailand, Israel, The Republic of Georgia, China, The Netherlands Antilles, and throughout the US. Commissioned by corporations and advertising agencies for special events, performance art and interactive media which includes TV, film, and print, Stimmell's street paintings convey the spirit of creativity, art, and culture.

Career
Melanie Stimmell Van Latum is a graduate of Art Center College of Design with a degree in Illustration and was she was trained as an oil painter and digital media artist.  After graduating she worked as a lead technical director for the feature film South Park: Bigger, Longer & Uncut and then for the South Park TV series for 8 years.  The acclaimed artist from Las Vegas, made her Park West debut at the gallery’s special New Year’s Weekend live-streaming auctions and immediately proved popular with the collectors in attendance. 12 original paintings by Stimmell were featured, and all 12 sold out during the weekend’s auction events. In fact, there was such a demand for Stimmell’s work that she even added three additional paintings that were still being worked on in her studio—and all three of those paintings sold out as well. But that wasn’t Stimmell’s only milestone this past weekend. The artist also premiered two new graphic works for Park West’s New Year’s auctions, which were quickly embraced. The first, “The Countess Ova Rose,” was sold 48 times. The second, “The Messenger,” was sold over 120 times—shattering the previous Park West record for the most works of the same image sold by any artist in a single day.

Fine Art 
Stimmell is a prolific fine artist creating whimsical works in soft pastels and oils that she shows predominantly through Park West Galleries.  Her favorite subject is the divine feminine with elements of nature - sweet creatures and a serene environment with a bit of the quirky as her goddesses almost always sport incredibly sculptural, fantastical hair. 
In 2021, Stimmell and her team (We Talk Chalk) created the murals in the domed ceiling of the new Grand Entrance in Caesar’s Palace in Las Vegas.  

Stimmell is also a fine artist creating works in soft pastels and oils that she shows in Southern California galleries under her married name, Melanie Van Latum.  For the past 11 years Stimmell has been creating asphalt masterpieces and leading workshops for cultural and children's charity events around the world including Youth in arts, Children's Creative Project, Larimer Arts Association, Bakersfield Museum of Art Educational
Programs, New Technology High School, Kayoo, Imadon Group, Visual Arts Scholastic Event, Les Craies d'Azur, and The Center for Hearing and Speech. She offers street painting workshops to children through the Orange County Performing Arts Center and the Los Angeles Music Center. She is currently teaching students from English classes at South Gate High School to street paint (Ms. Bell, Mr. DeLeon and Mr. Stelzreid's classes), and how to incorporate art into the core curriculum.

Stimmell has worked in conjunction with online Photoshop guru Mark Monciardini of Photoshop Top Secret to create Photoshop tutorials for photographers and artists.

Chalk art
In 1999, while at South Park, Stimmell began street painting for festivals in the United States including the I Madonnari Festival in Santa Barbara and the Sarasota Chalk Festival, America's first International chalk festival, in Sarasota, Florida.  In 2006 she was commissioned to create the festival's 20th Anniversary featured painting at the steps of the Mission Santa Barbara.  She was chosen as one of 3 American artists to paint in Istanbul, Turkey for their first street painting festival in 2004.  Having painted for several cultural events in the Netherlands, Melanie returned in the summer of 2007 to work with an international group of street painters from Italy, Germany, and the Netherlands to paint a tribute to the churches and cathedrals of Utrecht.  Stimmell's painting, 'The Entombment', was on display in the Augustinus church of Utrecht.

Stimmell is co-founder of 'We Talk Chalk', a company that offers solutions to event or marketing needs through the use of (3D) street painting and multimedia.  Led by Melanie and Remco Van Latum, We Talk Chalk introduced the art of 3-D street painting to countries such as Israel, Thailand, Colombia, and The Republic of Georgia. The city of Chiang Mai hosted their first street painting festival in March 2012, with the help of Melanie, Remco, and 3 other We Talk Chalk artists. To celebrate the ninetieth anniversary of Tel Aviv suburb Ramat Hasharon, Israeli and 8 International artists from 'We Talk Chalk,' including Melanie, used 3-D chalk drawings to transform Bialik Street into an urban art compound. The festival had as many as 50,000 visitors, including Israel’s President Shimon Peres who posed with paintings by Melanie Stimmell and Ruben Poncia.

In August 2013, Stimmell and We Talk Chalk created the longest anamorphic painting in the world. The piece, commissioned by Smirnoff and developed in partnership with Index Creative Village and Nannapas Publisher Co., may be found in Asia’s famous Siam Center. Total length, an astounding 165 meters (543 feet). Total square footage measured just under 3,000.

In 2009, under the Stimmell's artistic direction, Expressions in Chalk Street Painting Festival in London, Ontario, Canada, recreated the central ceiling of the Sistine Chapel at 18 x 92 feet.  Stimmell also worked as a featured artist on the 2002 San Rafael Sistine Chapel Project.  Since then, Stimmell has secured her Maestro status in Europe with her second win in the Netherlands and the highest honor a street painter is bestowed, Italy's Maestro Gold Medal in Grazie di Curtatone.

References

External links 

Park West Profile Page of Melanie Stimmell
We Talk Chalk

Melanie Stimmell & Mark Monciardini

Living people
Artists from Nevada
Pavement artists
Art Center College of Design alumni
1975 births
American women painters
Painters from California
21st-century American women artists